Alvin S. Trow (15 September 1838 – 9 September 1909) was a member of the Wisconsin State Assembly for a term.

Biography
Trow was born on September 15, 1838 in what would become Walworth, Wisconsin. Pursuits he followed include steamboat, lumber and flour mercantile businesses, along with dairy and cranberry farming. On January 22, 1865, Trow married Sarah J. Knapp. He died on September 9, 1909 in Battle Creek, Michigan. Trow, Wisconsin was named after him.

Political career
Trow lived in Merrillan and was elected to the Assembly from the 7th District of Jackson County, Wisconsin in 1880. Additionally, he chaired the county board of Winnebago County, Wisconsin.

References

People from Walworth, Wisconsin
Politicians from Oshkosh, Wisconsin
People from Jackson County, Wisconsin
Members of the Wisconsin State Assembly
Businesspeople from Wisconsin
Dairy farmers
Farmers from Wisconsin
1838 births
1909 deaths
Burials in Wisconsin
People from Winnebago County, Wisconsin
19th-century American politicians